The 2020 United States presidential election in Alabama took place on Tuesday, November 3, 2020, as part of the 2020 United States presidential election in which all 50 states and the District of Columbia participated. Alabama voters chose nine electors to represent them in the Electoral College via a popular vote pitting incumbent Republican President Donald Trump and his running mate, incumbent Vice President Mike Pence, against Democratic challenger and former Vice President Joe Biden and his running mate, United States Senator Kamala Harris of California. Also on the ballot was the Libertarian nominee, psychology lecturer Jo Jorgensen and her running mate, entrepreneur and podcaster Spike Cohen. Write-in candidates were permitted without registration, and their results were not individually counted.

Prior to the election, all 14 news organizations making predictions considered this a state Trump would win, or otherwise a safe red state. A socially conservative Bible Belt state, Alabama has voted for the Republican candidate in every election since 1980 and has done so by double-digit margins in all of them except 1980, 1992, and 1996. Per exit polls by Edison Research, Biden's only strength came from African American voters with 89%; this strength was reflected in the majority-black counties of the Black Belt that Biden carried. Conversely, Trump dominated key Republican constituencies, including 92% among white born-again Evangelicals. Trump also carried 72 percent of Alabama's white vote overall, winning several suburban counties near Birmingham, Montgomery and Mobile with well over 70 percent of the vote.

Primary elections
The primary elections were held on Super Tuesday, March 3, 2020.

Republican primary
As one of the Super Tuesday states, little campaigning has been done here, and the focus had been on the highly competitive Republican senatorial primary, which was expected to boost turnout.

Democratic primary

General election

Predictions

Polling
Graphical summary

Aggregate polls

Polls

Donald Trump vs. Michael Bloomberg

Donald Trump vs. Pete Buttigieg

Donald Trump vs. Bernie Sanders

Donald Trump vs. Elizabeth Warren

With generic opponent

Fundraising 
According to the Federal Election Commission, in 2019 and 2020, Donald Trump and his interest groups raised $4,412,645.01, Joe Biden and his interest groups raised $2,412,420.93, and Jo Jorgensen raised $8,172.29 from Alabama-based contributors.

Candidate ballot access 

 Donald Trump / Mike Pence, Republican
Joe Biden / Kamala Harris, Democratic
 Jo Jorgensen / Spike Cohen, Libertarian

In addition, write-in candidates were allowed without registration, and their votes were not counted individually.

Electoral slates
Technically the voters of Alabama cast their ballots for electors, or representatives to the Electoral College, rather than directly for the President and Vice President. Alabama is allocated 9 electors because it has 7 congressional districts and 2 senators. All candidates who appear on the ballot or qualify to receive write-in votes must submit a list of 9 electors who pledge to vote for their candidate and their running mate. Whoever wins the most votes in the state is awarded all 9 electoral votes. Their chosen electors then vote for president and vice president. Although electors are pledged to their candidate and running mate, they are not obligated to vote for them. An elector who votes for someone other than their candidate is known as a faithless elector. In the state of Alabama, a faithless elector's vote is counted and not penalized.

The electors of each state and the District of Columbia met on December 15, 2020, to cast their votes for president and vice president. All 9 pledged electors cast their votes for President Donald Trump and Vice President Mike Pence. The Electoral College itself never meets as one body. Instead, the electors from each state and the District of Columbia met in their respective capitols. The electoral vote was tabulated and certified by Congress in a joint session on January 6, 2021 per the Electoral Count Act.

These electors were nominated by each party in order to vote in the Electoral College should their candidate win the state:

Results

Results by county

Results by congressional district
Trump won 6 of 7 congressional districts. Trump's 81.2% in  Alabama's 4th district was his best showing of any congressional district in the nation.

Exit polls

Edison 
The following are estimates from exit polls conducted by the Edison Research for the National Election Pool (encompassing ABC News, CBS News, CNN, and NBC News) interviewing 1,201 Alabama voters, adjusted to match the actual vote count.

Associated Press 
The following are estimates from exit polls conducted by the University of Chicago for the Associated Press interviewing 1,905 likely voters in Alabama, adjusted to match the actual vote count.

Analysis 
The Democratic Party dominated Alabama politics in the early 19th century. The party held an 84-year streak on the presidential ballot from 1876 and 1944, and did not vote for a Republican between 1872 and 1964. Congressional and local politics were effectively one-party systems as well even into the early 21st century. Yet, the Southern Strategy and realignment of political parties made the Republicans the prominent political party in the South as evangelical White Southerners realigned to the Republicans in response and opposition to the Democratic support of Civil Rights legislation. Republican ascendance to the presidential ballot began in 1964, when conservative Barry Goldwater easily carried the state among others in the Deep South, despite Lyndon B. Johnson's nationwide landslide. Johnson wiped out Goldwater in most of the rest of the country  due to Johnson portraying Goldwater's views as anti-civil rights and pro-war, the former of which also appealed more to the Southern states. Thus, this election marked a turning point in Alabama politics, creating a Republican advantage that slowly trickled downballot. As a consequence, today, it is now one of the quintessential Republican states in the South, and a Trump victory was near-guaranteed.

According to the Pew Research Center, Alabama is tied with neighboring Mississippi for the most religious state in the country: as of 2016, 77% of adults are "highly religious" and 82% believe in God. Just as with other Bible Belt states, the dominating evangelical population in rural and suburban Alabama more than offset any gains made by Vice President Biden. Biden did win Jefferson County, which encompasses Alabama's largest city, Birmingham, by a margin of 13.15%. Birmingham was a potential host for the 2020 Democratic National Convention, but it was not chosen. The rest of the counties he won were in the Black Belt, a Democratic enclave in Alabama due to high proportions of African Americans. Highly fertile black soil made this area a hotbed for slavery in the antebellum and Civil War days, and once these slaves were emancipated in 1865 and enfranchised in the 1960s, this collection of counties, all of which but Russell still being majority-Black, became solidly Democratic: seven of them gave 70% or more of their ballots to Biden, and two (Greene and Macon) gave him over 80%. However, the Great Migration saw most of these counties become rural and sparsely populated, with the exception of Montgomery County, home to the state capital of Montgomery.

Trump easily outperformed these wins with victories in every other metropolitan area and the Birmingham suburbs. He won, in order of population, Mobile, Madison, Shelby, Tuscaloosa, and Baldwin counties, all of which are heavy population centers with powerfully Republican suburbs. Nonetheless, Biden's performances in Madison County (home to Huntsville) and Shelby County were the best of any Democrat since that of Jimmy Carter in 1980. Trump also carried all rural counties outside of the Black Belt; 18 counties gave him over 80% of the vote. He also carried the two swing counties of Barbour and Conecuh. Trump's largest margin was in the historically Republican Winston County, where he received 90.35% of the vote.

Per exit polls by the Associated Press, Trump's strength in Alabama came from 88% of White born again/evangelical Christians, which comprised 53% of voters. Protestant voters backed Trump with 75% of the vote, Catholics with 59%, and other Christians with 63%. Expectedly, Biden had his greatest strength among other religious groups, whom he captured 56–43, and nonreligious voters, who backed him 60–38. 59% of voters believed abortion should be illegal in all or most cases, and these voters backed Trump by 84–15. Other policy divides were also evident: 48% of voters supported COVID-19 restrictions over economic harm, while 50% supported the opposite. These groups backed Biden 68–30 and Trump 90–7, respectively. 70% of voters believed racism is a significant issue in American society, and these voters decided to back Biden 50–48, but were usurped by the other 30% of voters who believed the opposite and gave 94% of their support to Trump.

As is the case in most Southern states, there was a stark racial divide in voting in this election, with Trump capturing 78% of white Alabamians and Biden winning 91% of black Alabamians. While Trump carried all gender, age, and education groups, Biden was most competitive among women (53% of voters, backing Trump 59–40), voters aged 18 to 29 (12% of voters, backing Trump 52–45), and postgraduates (11% of the electorate, backing Trump 53–44).

This election corresponded with the 2020 U.S. Senate election in Alabama, where incumbent Democrat Doug Jones – who was elected by a 21,924 vote margin in a 2017 special election – ran for a full six-year term but was defeated by Republican football coach Tommy Tuberville. Despite losing, Jones outperformed Biden by 5.1 percentage points.

See also
 United States presidential elections in Alabama
 2020 United States elections
 2020 United States presidential election
 2020 Democratic Party presidential primaries
 2020 Democratic Party presidential debates
 2020 Democratic Party presidential forums
 Results of the 2020 Democratic Party presidential primaries
 2020 Republican Party presidential primaries
 2020 Republican Party presidential debates
 Results of the 2020 Republican Party presidential primaries
 2020 United States Senate election in Alabama
 2020 United States House of Representatives elections
 Elections in Alabama

Notes

Partisan clients

References

Further reading

External links
 
 
  (state affiliate of the U.S. League of Women Voters)
 

Alabama
2020
Presidential